This article is about the US number-one songs chart from 1950–1958.

Billboard number-one singles charts preceding the Billboard Hot 100 were updated weekly by Billboard magazine and the leading indicator of popular music for the American music industry since 1940 and until the Billboard Hot 100 chart was established in 1958.

Before the Billboard Hot 100 chart was established in August 1958, Billboard used to publish several weekly charts. Throughout most of the 1950s, the magazine published the following three charts to measure a song's popularity:

Best Sellers in Stores – ranked the biggest selling singles in retail stores, as reported by merchants surveyed throughout the country.
Most Played by Jockeys – ranked the most played songs on United States radio stations, as reported by radio disc jockeys and radio stations.
Most Played in Jukeboxes – ranked the most played songs in jukeboxes across the United States. At that time, this chart used to be one of the most important channels for measuring the popularity of a song among the younger generation of listeners, as many US radio stations resisted adding rock and roll music to their playlists for many years.

The chart shown in this article comes from the Best Sellers in Stores chart only.

Number ones 
Key
 – Number-one single of the year

Statistics by decade

By artist 
The following artists achieved three or more number-one hits during the 1950–1958. A number of artists had number-one singles on their own as well as part of a collaboration.

Artists by total number of weeks at number-one 
The following artists were featured in top of the chart for the highest total number of weeks during the 1950–1958.

Songs by total number of weeks at number-one 
The following songs were featured in top of the chart for the highest total number of weeks during the 1950–1958.

See also
 List of Billboard number-one singles
 1950s in music

References

1950s record charts
 1950s
1950s in American music